The 2011 Recife Open Internacional de Tenis was a professional tennis tournament played on hard courts. It was the first edition of the tournament which was part of the 2011 ATP Challenger Tour. It took place in Recife, Brazil between 26 September and 2 October 2011.

ATP entrants

Seeds

 1 Rankings are as of September 19, 2011.

Other entrants
The following players received wildcards into the singles main draw:
  Thiago Alves
  José Pereira
  Bruno Sant'anna
  João Pedro Sorgi

The following players received entry from the qualifying draw:
  Marcelo Demoliner
  Nicolás Massú
  Joaquín-Jesús Monteferrario
  Pedro Sousa

Champions

Singles

 Ricardo Mello def.  Rogério Dutra da Silva, 7–6(7–5), 6–3

Doubles

 Guido Andreozzi /  Marcel Felder def.  Rodrigo Grilli /  André Miele, 6–3, 6–3

External links
ITF Search
ATP official site

2011 ATP Challenger Tour
Hard court tennis tournaments
Tennis tournaments in Brazil